Bilateral relations exist between the State of Qatar and the Kingdom of Bahrain. They first began in 1971.

On 5 June 2017, Bahrain officially cut diplomatic ties with Qatar, giving the country's diplomats 48 hours to leave. On 6 January 2021, Qatar and Bahrain agreed to fully restore diplomatic ties.

History
Bahrain and Qatar shared a similar history for belonging to the Gulf region and speak Arabic language as the first language, as well as having Islam as the state religion.

Territorial disputes 
Starting in 1936, Qatar and Bahrain were involved in territorial disputes over the Hawar Islands, Fasht Al Azm, Fasht Dibal, Qit'at Jaradah, and Zubarah. In 1996, Bahrain boycotted the GCC summit hosted in Qatar, claiming that the last summit held in Qatar in 1990 was used as a platform to reiterate their territorial claims to the other GCC states. They also cited the 1986 Qatari incursion in Fasht Dibal as a reason for not attending. In December 1996, two Qatari citizens, Salwa Fakhri and Fahad Al Baker, were arrested on charges of espionage in Bahrain. During the trial, it was purported that Qatar had been involved in a prior spying mission which was uncovered by Bahraini authorities in 1987. In January 1997, a member of Bahrain's ruling family, Nasser Al Khalifa, defected to Qatar in a highly publicized instance in which he flew a Bahraini military helicopter to the Qatari capital.

The disputes were resolved by the International Court of Justice (ICJ) on 16 March 2001, giving Bahrain the Hawar Islands (excluding the Janan Island), Qit'at Jaradah, and Fasht Al Azm, with Qatar receiving Zubarah, Fasht Dibal, and the Janan Island.

Zubarah
From the 19th century onward, the two countries periodically disputed the ownership of Zubarah, a town on the north-west coast of Qatar. Tensions were heightened in 1939 after Qatar constructed a fort in the town; an act which was deemed illegal by Bahrain. A settlement was reached in 1944 during a meeting mediated by the Saudis, in which Qatar recognized Bahrain's customary rights, such as grazing, and visiting with no formalities necessary. However, this accord was broken shortly after, following the construction of another fort by Qatar.

In 1953, Bahrain reiterated its claims over Zubarah when it sent a party of students and teachers to Zubarah who proceeded to write 'Bahrain' on the walls of Zubarah Fort. Furthermore, the Bahrain Education Department published maps which alleged Bahraini sovereignty over the entire north-west coast of the peninsula. Qatar responded by stationing troops in the fort in 1954. The case was resolved in Qatar's favor by the ICJ in 2001.

Fasht Dibal
A dispute arose over Fasht Dibal in 1985 after Bahrain began constructing fortifications on the island. Qatar considered the construction to be a violation of an existing agreement made in 1978. In April 1986, Qatari troops arrived on the island via helicopter and declared it a 'restricted zone'. They seized several Bahraini officials and 29 construction workers hired by the Dutch contracting company Ballast Nedam. On 12 May 1986, following protests by the Netherlands and mediation by several GCC member states, Bahrain and Qatar reached a settlement, after which the foreign workers were released. Qatari troops evacuated the island on 15 June. The island was later awarded to Qatar in the aftermath of the 2001 ICJ case.

Nationality controversy
In 2014, Bahrain accused Qatar of offering certain Bahraini families Qatari citizenship in exchange for dropping their Bahraini citizenship. It was reported that Qatar was targeting Sunni citizens, a threat to Bahrain's demographics as the majority of the population is Shia while the ruling family is Sunni.  Undersecretary of Nationality, Passport and Residence Affairs of Bahrain, Sheikh Rashid bin Khalifa Al Khalifa, was quoted as saying,“We are confident that Qatar, a brotherly neighbour with Bahrain, will reconsider its position on this matter because naturalising Bahrainis negatively affects the security situation and the high national interests of Bahrain.” He also claimed that being a citizen of a country part of the GCC gave citizens of one country the right to work, own property and move between the other member countries thus changing nationalities wouldn't be necessary. Bahrain also claimed that it was a violation of an agreement of non-interference, signed on 17 April 2014, in the internal affairs of GCC member states. On 13 August 2014, Qatar pledged to stop offering GCC nationals Qatari citizenship during a meeting of GCC foreign ministers in Jeddah. Despite this, Bahrain's interior minister threatened action against Qatar and claimed that they were still engaging in these activities. It was claimed that Qatar had naturalised hundreds of Bahrainis and as a result, Bahrain imposed fines on any Bahraini that accepted citizenship. Qatar's Director General of Public Security of Interior Ministry Major General called the quote "inaccurate" and argued that Qatar was only attempting to naturalise citizens of Qatari origin.

Ambassador controversy
On 5 March 2014, Bahrain, along with  Saudi Arabia and the United Arab Emirates, recalled its ambassador from Qatar since Qatar failed to abide by an agreement signed by the GCC states to not support groups that posed a threat to fellow GCC members. On 16 November, it was reported that Bahrain, Saudi Arabia, and the UAE were returning their ambassadors to Qatar following an emergency meeting in Riyadh, stating that they had reached an understanding.

Embassies
Bahrain had an embassy in Doha until 2017. Qatar also had an embassy in Manama until June 2017. The Qatari ambassador in Bahrain until October 2016 was Sheikh Jassim bin Mohamed bin Saud Al Abdulrahman Al-Thani. The head of mission at the Bahraini embassy in Qatar is currently Nasser Faris al-Qatami, who is the charge d'affaires.

Cyber attack and termination
On 3 June 2017, the Twitter account of Bahraini foreign minister Khalid bin Ahmed Al Khalifa was hacked in a Qatari cyberattack.  Two days later, on 5 June 2017, Bahrain has announced that it will cut ties with Qatar as well. Yet, Islam Hassan argues that "Insofar as Bahrain is concerned, the small Kingdom has been toeing the Saudi foreign policy for the past couple of years. It seems that their severing of ties with Qatar was mainly an answer to a Saudi call."

See also
 Foreign relations of Bahrain
 Foreign relations of Qatar
 Qatar diplomatic crisis

References

 
Bilateral relations of Qatar
Qatar